Retirement Fund (Incorporated) (KWAP) is a statutory body which manages the pension scheme for Malaysia's public employees. KWAP is the investment manager of the Retirement Fund, which is applied towards financing the government's pension liability, and is responsible for the administration and payment of pension to public sector retirees. KWAP is one of three main bodies in Malaysia's pension system, the others being the Employees Provident Fund (for private sector employees) and Armed Forces Fund Board (for military personnel). It is also regarded as one of Malaysia's government-linked investment companies (GLICs).

History
Prior to KWAP's establishment, the public pension fund in Malaysia was managed by the Pensions Trust Fund, whose operations fell under the responsibility of the Accountant General. The Pensions Trust Fund grew from an initial government grant of RM500 million in 1991 to RM42 billion in 2007. In March 2007, KWAP was established under the Retirement Fund Act and assumed all powers, functions, activities, assets and liabilities of the Pensions Trust Fund. In November 2015, KWAP was appointed as agent to the government for overall pension management and payment operation, taking over this role from the Public Services Department's Post Pension Services Division.

Operations
The fund receives contributions from the Federal Government of Malaysia, statutory bodies and local authorities. The contributions are invested by the fund in a mix of equities, bonds, property, private equity and infrastructure, with the investment returns used to finance the government's pension liabilities. The fund's Investment Panel determines the fund's investment policy and asset allocation strategy.

KWAP also operates the Pension Services Department (PeSD) in Cyberjaya which processes payment of pensions and other benefits to public pensioners.

References

External links
 
 

2007 establishments in Malaysia
Government-owned companies of Malaysia
Age pension systems
Social security in Malaysia
Investment in Malaysia
Federal ministries, departments and agencies of Malaysia
Public pension funds
Malaysian companies established in 2007